Heliotropium dentatum is a species of plant in the family Boraginaceae. It is endemic to Yemen.  Its natural habitats are subtropical or tropical dry forests and subtropical or tropical dry shrubland.

References

Endemic flora of Socotra
dentatum
Vulnerable plants
Taxonomy articles created by Polbot
Taxa named by Isaac Bayley Balfour